Harlaw Reservoir is a small reservoir in the City of Edinburgh Council area, Scotland, UK, situated at the base of the Pentland Hills near Currie and Balerno.

It is located behind an earth gravity dam, constructed between 1843 and 1848 to the east and downstream of Threipmuir Reservoir, to a design by civil engineer James Jardine. The work was commissioned by the Edinburgh Water Company as a compensation reservoir for the Water of Leith.

See also
List of reservoirs and dams in the United Kingdom

References

External links
Geograph image Harlaw Reservoir spillway
Geograph image: Path from Harlaw Reservoir to Threipmuir Reservoir

Reservoirs in Edinburgh
RHarlaw